Nivlu (also Romanized as Nīvlū; also known as Nīvlar) is a village in Baranduzchay-ye Jonubi Rural District, in the Central District of Urmia County, West Azerbaijan Province, Iran. At the 2006 census, its population was 213, in 61 families.

References 

Populated places in Urmia County